Lake Nakuru is one of the Rift Valley lakes at an elevation of  above sea level. It lies to the south of Nakuru, in the rift valley of Kenya and is protected by  Lake Nakuru National Park.

The lake's abundance of algae used to attract a vast quantity of flamingos that famously lined the shore. Other birds also flourish in the area, as do warthogs, baboons and other large mammals. Eastern black rhinos and southern white rhinos have also been introduced.

The lake's level dropped dramatically in the early 1990s but has since largely recovered. In 2013, the lake received an alarming increase in the water levels that led to the migration of flamingos to Lake Bogoria in search for food supply. Between 2010-2020 Lake Nakuru increased in surface area from 40 to 68 square kilometres. 677 households, parts of Nakuru town and National Park areas had been flooded.

Nakuru means "Dust or Dusty Place" in the Maasai language. Lake Nakuru National Park, close to Nakuru town, was established in 1961. It started off small, only encompassing the famous lake and the surrounding mountainous vicinity, but has since been extended to include a large part of the savannahs.

Lake Nakuru is protected under the Ramsar Convention on wetlands.

Lake Nakuru National Park 

Lake Nakuru National Park (188 km2, 73 mi2), was created in 1961 around Lake Nakuru, near Nakuru Town. It is best known for its thousands, sometimes millions of flamingos nesting along the shores. The surface of the shallow lake is often hardly recognizable due to the continually shifting mass of pink. The number of flamingos on the lake varies with water and food conditions and the best vantage point is from Baboon Cliff. Also of interest is an area of 188 km (116 mi) around the lake fenced off as a sanctuary to protect giraffes as well as both black and white rhinos.

The park has recently been enlarged partly to provide the sanctuary for the black rhinos. This undertaking has necessitated a fence - to keep out poachers rather than to restrict the movement of wildlife. The park marches for 12.1 km on the south eastern boundary with the Soysambu conservancy which represents a possible future expansion of habitat for the rhinos and the only remaining wildlife corridor to Lake Naivasha.

The park now (2009) has more than 25 eastern black rhinoceros, one of the largest concentrations in the country, plus around 70 southern white rhinos. There are also a number of Rothschild's giraffe, again relocated for safety from western Kenya beginning in 1977. Waterbuck are very common and both the Kenyan subspecies are found here. Among the predators are lions, cheetahs and leopards, the latter being seen much more frequently in recent times. The park also has large sized pythons that inhabit the dense woodlands, and can often be seen crossing the roads or dangling from trees.

As well as flamingos, there are myriad other bird species that inhabit the lake and the area surrounding it, such as African fish eagle, Goliath heron, hamerkop, pied kingfisher and Verreaux's eagle among others of their kind.

Habitat and wildlife 

Lake Nakuru, a small (it varies from 5 to 45 square kilometers) shallow alkaline lake on the southern edge of the town of Nakuru lies about 164 kilometers north of Nairobi. It can therefore be visited in a day tour from the capital or more likely as part of a circuit taking in the Masai Mara (Also Maasai Mara) or Lake Baringo and east to Samburu. The lake is world-famous as the location of the greatest bird spectacle on earth - myriads of fuchsia pink flamingos whose numbers are legion, often more than a million - or even two million. They feed on the abundant algae, which thrives in the warm waters. Scientists reckon that the flamingo population at Nakuru consumes about 250,000 kg of algae per hectare of surface area per year.

There are two types of flamingo species: the lesser flamingo can be distinguished by its deep red carmine bill and pink plumage unlike the greater, which has a bill with a black tip. The lesser flamingos are ones that are commonly pictured in documentaries mainly because they are large in number. The number of flamingos has been decreasing recently, perhaps due to too much tourism, pollution resulting from industries waterworks nearby who dump waste into the waters or simply because of changes in water quality which makes the lake temporarily inhospitable. Usually, the lake recedes during the dry season and floods during the wet season.

In recent years, there have been wide variations between the dry and wet seasons' water levels. It is suspected that this is caused by increasing watershed land conversion to intensive crop production and urbanization, both which reduce the capacity of soils to absorb water, recharge ground water and thus increase seasonal flooding. Pollution and drought destroy the flamingos' food, Cyanobacteria, or blue-green algae, and causing them to migrate to the nearby Lakes, more recently lakes Elmenteita, Simbi Nyaima and Bogoria. Local climate changes have also been hypothesized to contribute to the changing environmental conditions in the lakes catchment. Recent media reports indicate increasing concern among stakeholders, as mass flamingo migrations and deaths could spell doom to the tourism industry.

The flamingos feed on algae, created from their droppings mixing in the warm alkaline waters, and plankton. But flamingo are not the only avian attraction, also present are two large fish eating birds, pelicans and cormorants. Despite the tepid and alkaline waters, a diminutive fish, Alcolapia grahami has flourished after being introduced in the early 1960s. The lake is rich in other bird life. There are over 400 resident species on the lake and in the surrounding park. Thousands of both little grebes and white winged black terns are frequently seen as are stilts, avocets, ducks, and in the European winter the migrant waders.

Zooplankton: The monogonont rotifer species Brachionus sp. Austria (belonging to the Brachionus plicatilis cryptic species complex) occurs in the lake.

See also

 Rift Valley lakes
 Great Rift Valley
 Rivers of Kenya

Properties and lodges 
(listed alphabetically)
 http://www.flamingohillcamp.com/
 http://www.sopalodges.com/lake-nakuru-sopa-lodge/overview
 Lakira Camp
 http://mailisaba.ujimafoundation.org/
 https://www.sarovahotels.com/maracamp-masai-mara/

References

External links 

 National Geographic – "Mysterious Kenya Flamingo Die-Offs Tied to Toxins, Study Says" (November 2002)

Lakes of Kenya
National parks of Kenya
Saline lakes of the Great Rift Valley
Nakuru
Shrunken lakes
Protected areas established in 1961
Ramsar sites in Kenya
World Heritage Sites in Kenya
Landforms of Rift Valley Province
Tourist attractions in Rift Valley Province